Shirley Fry and Doris Hart successfully defended their title, defeating Louise Brough and Maureen Connolly in the final, 8–6, 6–3 to win the ladies' doubles tennis title at the 1952 Wimbledon Championships.

Seeds

  Shirley Fry /  Doris Hart (champions)
  Louise Brough /  Maureen Connolly (final)
  Thelma Long /  Pat Todd (semifinals)
  Susan Partridge /  Jean Rinkel-Quertier (semifinals)

Draw

Finals

Top half

Section 1

Section 2

Bottom half

Section 3

Section 4

References

External links

Women's Doubles
Wimbledon Championship by year – Women's doubles
Wimbledon Championships
Wimbledon Championships